Vehicle registration plates of Qatar started in the 1950s. The current version was adopted in 2012. The international vehicle registration code for Qatar is Q. 

In a 2016 auction, licence plate 411 was sold for $960,000.

References 

Qatar
Transport in Qatar